Joel Hilgenberg (born July 10, 1962 in Iowa City, Iowa) was an American football center in the National Football League for the New Orleans Saints. Hilgenberg played college football at the University of Iowa and he is the brother of former center Jay Hilgenberg, and the nephew of Minnesota Vikings linebacker Wally Hilgenberg; the brothers were teammates on the Saints in 1993.

Hilgenberg was offensive quality control coach for the Green Bay Packers in 2011, and assistant offensive line coach for 2012-13.  He resigned his coaching position in April 2014.

References

1962 births
Living people
Sportspeople from Iowa City, Iowa
American football centers
Iowa Hawkeyes football players
New Orleans Saints players
National Conference Pro Bowl players